

Biography
Gianfranco Goria, born on August 3rd 1954 in Bruneck (South Tyrol, Italy), is an Italian cartoonist, script-writer, Disney comics creator, blogger and journalist. Moved with his parents to Rome  and then to Turin. He carried out his university studies at the University of Turin, under the guidance of the orientalist Oscar Botto.

He founded the Italian cartoonists society Anonima Fumetti, the daily news service afNews, the Foundation and Museum of Comic Art Franco Fossati, and the National Union of Comic Artists Sindacato italiano lavoratori fumetto. He is the editor of the Italian editions of important essays about comic art by Scott McCloud, Will Eisner and Benoit Peeters.  Goria is also a teacher of Graphic Literature and lecturer, specialized in the works of Hergé (he was also in charge of the philological supervision of the new Italian edition of The Adventures of Tintin for Rizzoli Lizard) and Edgar Pierre Jacobs (Blake and Mortimer). Among his Disney stories, the special homage to Kurosawa's Seven Samurai.
Since January 2023 he is the first Honorary Consul of Syldavia in Italy.

References

External links
Gianfranco Goria on Lambiek Comiclopedia
Full biography.
afNews, daily news and journalistic non profit blog on comics art - ISSN 1971-1824
association Anonima Fumetti - association of Italian Comics Artists
SILF-SLC Sezione Fumetto - Comics Artists Union
Gianfranco Goria interview about Union SILF
Fondazione e Museo del Fumetto e della Comunicazione Franco Fossati
View Conference speaker Gianfranco Goria
Tintin, un giovanotto di novant'anni - the first Italian essay on Tintin written by an Italian tintinologist, for an Italian publisher, in Italian for the Italian public
Honorary Consul of the Kingdom of Syldavia in Taurinia
Tintin: the meeting of the Consuls of Syldavia - Diplomats, very serious and a little crazy, of the imaginary country created by Hergé, the "Consuls of Syldavia" will hold their Consular Meetings this Wednesday 25 September in Narbonne…

Italian cartoonists
Living people
Year of birth missing (living people)